Anioma people are a subgroup of the Igbo ethnic group in Delta State, Nigeria. They are made up of communities which span across 9 Local government areas and speak different varieties of the Igbo language, including the Enuani language, Ukwuani language, and the Ika-Ibo language. The farther away you go from Onitcha after the Niger bridge and heading towards Agbor and Benin city, the deeper the dialect. They occupy Delta North Senatorial District, which consists of the Enuani (Oshimili/Aniocha), Ika, and Ukwuani/Ndokwa linguistic zones of Delta State.

Anioma means "Good Land" in the Igbo language, and they have an estimated total population of approximately 1.8 million people.

Geography 
Anioma is located in the areas of the West Basin of River Niger, south-south within the present Delta state of Nigeria, it encompasses a land mass of about 6,300 km2 . In the political matters of the state, Anioma is often referred to as Delta North, as against the other peoples known as the Delta South and Delta Central in the same state. Anioma is bounded on the East by Anambra State, south-east by Imo and Rivers States, south Bayelsa State, south-west by Isoko, west by Urhobo people, north-west by Edo State and north by Kogi State. Anioma may therefore be regarded as highly contiguous to very many neighbours ethnic groups. The people have drawn experiences as a result of lying contiguous to numerous other towns, communities and states which characterizes the Anioma as one of the most peaceful regions in the country.

There are 25 Local government areas in Delta State, and the nine underneath make up the Anioma region:

 Aniocha North
 Aniocha South
 Ika south
 Ika North-East
 Ndokwa East
 Ndokwa West
 Oshimili North
 Oshimili South
 Ukwuani

Language 
Dialects of Anioma include: Enu-Ani dialect of Igbo Language spoken in Ibusa, Ogwashi-Uku, Asaba, parts of Igbodo, Ilah, Isseles, Idumujes, Onichas etc), Ika language (Agbor, Umunede, Owas etc) & Ukwuani-Aboh Language mostly spoken by the people of Ndokwa Ethnic Nationality. There are Anioma people in Edo state of Nigeria (Igbanke), Anambra state (Onitsha, Ozobulu, Obosi, Oraifite) Imo state (Oguta), Rivers state (Ndoni, Ogba) etc.

List of Anioma towns and communities 
Anioma towns and communities alphabetically arranged below:

Abah, Abala  Anikoko, Abavo, Abi, Abodei, Aboh, Adai, Adonta, Afor, Agbor, Akakpan-Isumpe, Ankara, Akoku, Akuku-Akumazi, Akumazi-Umuocha, Akwuku-Igbo, Alasime, Alidinma, Alihagu, Amai, Anakwa, Anifekide, Aninwalo, Aninwama-Jeta,  Aniofu, Aniogo, Anioma, Anuregu, Anwai, Asaba, Asaba-Ase,  Asaba-Ubulu, Ashaka,  Ashama, Atuma, Atuma-Iga, Azagba-Ogwashi, Azagba-Ubieni, Ebedi, Ebu, Edo-Ogwashi, Egbudu-Akah, Egbudu-Ogwashi, Ejeme-Agbor, Ejeme-Aniogo, Ejeme-Unor, Ekpecho, Ekpon, Ekwuemusana, Emu, Emuhu, Etua Etiti, Etua Ukpo, Ewulu, Ezi, Eziokpor, Ezionum, Ibodoni, Ibrode, Ibusa, Idumuesah, Idumuje-Ugboko, Idumuje-Unor, Idumu-Ogo, Igbanke, Igbodo, Igbuku, Illah, Isa-Ogwashi, Iselegu, Isheagu, Isikiti-Ishiagu, Issele-Azagba, Issele-Mkpitime, Issele-Uku, Isumpe,  Kwale, Mbiri, Ndemiri,  Ndokwa, Abbi, Inam-Abbi, Eziunm, Nkpolenyi, Nsukwa, Obeti, Obi Anyima, Obi Umutu, Obi, Obiaruku, Obikwele, Obinumba, Obior, Obodo-Eti, Obomkpa, Ogbe, Ogode, Ogume, Ogwashi-Uku, Oko Anala, Oko/Ogbele, Oko-Amakom, Okotomi, Okpa, Okpanam, Okwe, Oligbo, Oligbo, Olor-Usisa, Olu-Odu, Omaja,  Onicha Olona, Onicha-Ugbo, Onicha-Uku, Onitsha-Ukwuani, Onogbokor, Onuseti, Onya, Oolor-Ogwashi, Otolokpo, Otulu, Owa Nta, Owa-Abi, Owa-Alero,  Owa-Ofie, Owa-Oyibo, Owerri-Olubor, Ubulubu, Ubulu-Okiti, Ubulu-Okiti, Ubulu-Ukwu, Ubulu-Unor, Udumeje, Ugboba, Ugbodu, Ugbolu, Ugiliamai, Ukala-Okpunor, Ukala-Okwute, Ukwuani, Ukwunzu, Ukwu-Oba, Umuabu, Umu-Ebu Adonishaka, Umukwem, Umukwota, Umunede, Umuolu, Umute, Umutu, Unor, Unor, Unuaja, Ushie, Usisa, Utagba-Ogbe, Utagba-Unor, Utchi, Ute Aru, Ute Enugu, Utegbeje, Ute-Okpu, Utuoku.

Notable Anioma people 

 Joseph "Hannibal" Achuzie, military personnel and civil war veteran
 Hanks Anuku, Veteran Nollywood actor
 Phillip Asiodu, former Minister of Federal Republic of Nigeria
 Maryam Babangida, wife of  Former Nigerian Head of State, General Ibrahim Babangida
 Prof Joseph Chike Edozien, the Asagba of Asaba
 Tony Elumelu, Chairman of Heirs Holdings, the United Bank for Africa, Transcorp and founder of The Tony Elumelu Foundation
 Air-Marshal Paul Dike, former Chief of Defence Staff of Nigeria NASA
 Buchi Emecheta, Nigerian-born British novelist
 Godwin Emefiele, the current Governor of the Central Bank of Nigeria
 Faze, Nigerian Musician
 Lucky Irabor, Chief of Defence Staff, Nigeria
 Elizabeth Isichei, prominent historian
 Alex Iwobi, football player
 Emmanuel Ibe Kachikwu, Minister of State for Petroleum
 Stephen Okechukwu Keshi, former Super Eagles captain and Malian National Football Team Coach
 Demas Nwoko, prominent Sculptor of Nigeria
 Ned Nwoko, former senator
 Sam Obi, Former Acting Governor of Delta State and former Speaker, Delta State House of Assembly
 Nduka Obaigbena, Chairman & Editor-in-Chief of the THISDAY Media Group and ARISE News Channel
 Nduka Odizor, former Lawn tennis player
 Timothy Ogene, writer
 Joy Ogwu, former Mangaging Director of Nigeria Institute of International Affairs
 Ngozi Okonjo-Iweala, the current Director-general of the World Trade Organization
 Ifeanyi Okowa, former Nigerian Senator and current Governor of Delta State
 Austine "Jay-Jay" Okocha, former Captain of Super Eagles of Nigeria
 Sunday Oliseh, former Captain of super Eagles of Nigeria
 Lisa Omorodion, Nollywood Actress, producer and entrepreneur
 Dennis Osadebe, politician, poet, journalist and former premier of the now defunct Mid-Western Region of Nigeria, which now comprises Edo and Delta State.
 Jim Ovia, M/D Zenith Bank
 Zulu Sofola, the first published female Nigerian playwright and dramatist and first female Professor of Theater Arts in Africa.
 Nduka Ugbade, Nigeria's former football player and the first African to lift the world cup
 Patrick Utomi, Presidential Candidate and Founder of Lagos Business School

See also 

Igbo language	
Igboid languages
Organisation for the Advancement of Anioma Culture (OFAAC)

References

External links 
Reawakening in Delta North
https://web.archive.org/web/20150330003905/http://www.nigeriamasterweb.com/nmwpg1HarunaIgboMassacre.html
Asaba.com
Anioma USA

Further reading 
 
Ikime O. (ed). Groundwork of Nigerian history. Heineman educational books (Nigeria) PLC, Ibadan, 1980: 89-121.
Onwuejeogwu MA. Igbo civilization: Nri kingdom and hegemony; London, Ethnographica, 1981.
Obi Efeizomor II (Obi of Owa). Community development in Owa kingdom – the Nigerian factor. University of Benin press; Benin City-Nigeria; 1994: 303.

Languages of Nigeria
Igbo subgroups
 Igbo people
Ethnic groups in Nigeria